Mohammed "Hamoudi" Kna'an (or Kanaan, ; born ) is an Israeli professional footballer who plays as a forward for Israeli Premier League club Ashdod.

Early life
Kna'an was born in Majd al-Krum, Israel, to a Muslim-Arab family.

Club career
Kna'an started his early youth career in his hometown's F.C. Majd al-Krum academy. When he was 11, he joined the Maccabi Haifa youth academy. On 19 July 2018 he joined the F.C. Ashdod youth, for 5 years.

On 20 December 2018, Kna'an made his senior debut for F.C. Ashdod in the Israeli State Cup, coming on as a 79th minute substitute against Hapoel Ramat Gan, that ended in a 2–0 home win.

References

External links
 
 
 

2000 births
Living people
Israeli footballers
F.C. Ashdod players
Israeli Premier League players
Footballers from Majd al-Krum
Association football forwards
Israel youth international footballers
Israel under-21 international footballers
Arab-Israeli footballers
Arab citizens of Israel
Israeli Muslims